Krystala is a Philippine fantasy/sci-fi/adventure/soap opera serial (superserye/fantaserye) from the Philippines, where it was produced by and aired on ABS-CBN from October 11, 2004, to April 22, 2005. The show also aired simultaneously on The Filipino Channel and on a one-week delay on International Channel (now AZN-TV) in the United States.

This series is streaming on Kapamilya Online Live Global on February 4 and was replacing  Marina.

Premise
The series followed a young woman named Tala, who accidentally unearths a crystal that contained the spirit of the legendary diwata sorceress, Luwalhati, who was imprisoned a hundred years earlier by a devilish being, Harimon. As a promise to Luwalhati, Tala agrees to help her rid the world of evil spirits that, once in the possession or contact of human beings, can bring or unleash corruption and mayhem onto the world.

Knowing that kind of fury would lead to Manila, where most of them would blend into the city's large population, Tala decides to leave her Madulom tribe to move into the area, where she would blend into the mix as a normal working girl, working at a shopping mall.

She would learn, however, that most of the spirits also have ties to Harimon, who was also set free by a young girl named Zorah. (Tala would later learn that she was her mother, who had abandoned her as a child after she became possessed by Harimon.) Upon learning that Harimon and his band of co-horts (The fierce Super Z, female vampire Kamagona, flamboyant drag queen Terracota and shapeshifter Luminax) have resurfaced to unleash and finish the sinister plans to unveil a more evil being bent on taking over the human world, Tala uses her crystal to transform herself into the gold-and-blue clad super-sexy superheroine Krystala and uses her powers to protect those who are helpless... and to protect the people who are her close friends.

Character background
Faith, the daughter of Zorina and Martin de Gracia. When she was little, her family lived in the province far away from the city. One day, the little girl and her parents were being chased. Her mother told her to run far away from home before an evil man named Bacchus, kills the whole family (Bacchus and his men succeeded in killing the child's father and had kidnapped the child's mother).

A couple from the legendary Madulom tribe, Aleta and Joram, found the crying child near the grave of their newly buried daughter. Aleta was thinking that she should adopt Faith even though her husband and the tribes people think that adopting an outsider is unlucky. But since Aleta felt sorry for the child, she chose to adopt and name her as Tala, raising her with the guidance of Ima, the village fairy.

Years later, Tala was walking in the forest until she stumbled upon a secret cave. As she went in, she spotted a crystal that was just standing on a huge rock in the middle of the cave. Then a voice of a fairy name Luwalhati came out from the crystal. The fairy that was trapped in the crystal told her that she was the chosen one, the one anointed by the Mountain's Diwatas (fairies) to save the world by ridding it of evil engkantos (supernatural beings).  Tala then picked up the crystal and Luwalhati was released from the crystal.  Also, the crystal had given Tala amazing powers and by saying "Sa kapangyarihan ng kristal, ako ang iyong sugo, Krystala!", she was able to turn into the super heroine known as Krystala.

Reception
The show gained a 36% rating on its opening night, cementing Krystala as a successful hit among Philippine televiewers especially in the Mega Manila ratings where ABS-CBN started to lose its hold of the area. This caused many viewers from the channel's rival network, GMA Network, jump to ABS-CBN. It was known that GMA Network would lead in Mega Manila but ABS-CBN still led in the  nationwide ratings.

Its highest rating was its 3rd episode, 43.1% and an average of 33.1% (Mega Manila ratings).

Super Kontrabidas (The Villains)
 Emilio Garcia as Harimon - King of All Demons, creator of the red stones (mga pulang bato) which gives powers to whoever possesses one. He retreats after being defeated by Krystala.
 Alma Concepcion as Becca/Kabagona - A woman who has the features of a bat. Kabagona's real identity is a woman named Becca who was punished by Bacchus for a grave mistake, the punishment was being imprisoned in a mystical cave with bats as her only companion. It is from this imprisonment that Becca transforms into Kabagona. 
 Michael Flores as Terrence Cortesano Terracotta a.k.a. Badinger Z - A homosexual villain who has the ability to multiply, to scream really loud, to shoot lasers with his magical red stone (in a form of a ring). His real name is an ordinary man named Terrence who decided to be gay much to his father's disappointment. As a result, Terrence finds a red stone in a ring which he wears transforming himself into Terracotta. After Krystala defeats him he returns the red stone back to Harimon. He reconciles with his father afterwards.
 Desiree del Valle as Donna/Luminax - A woman who has the ability to turn into light, manipulate light, and attack with light (ex; light blast, lasers that shoot out of her eyes). She is formerly called Donna who was the daughter of Becca who became Kabagona. She plans to get revenge on Krystala for killing her mother.
 Chin Chin Gutierrez as Super Z - A woman with the ability to absorb the powers of other supernatural beings. She can use the powers that she absorbed. She is revealed to be Tala's mother, Zorah, who sent the young girl off in the forest to hide out of desperation just before she gets kidnapped by village attackers. Years later, in a fight with her new abusive husband, she accidentally reawakens Harimon, who soon possesses her body to gain strength and restart his evil plan. Later on as her own powers manifest, and she is able to separate herself from Harimon. She hides away for a while and eventually starts trying to redeem herself for her misdeeds while Harimon was influencing her. Harimon eventually returns to her again, this time manipulating her with illusions until she breaks and transforms into Super Z, but she is eventually able to overcome his manipulations and force him to retreat, solidifying her on the side of good.
 Neri Naig as Butiki Girl - One of the main villain in the series, act as the Lizard Girl that can heal her wounds and damages easily and get her tail back just like a lizard which she got from her great grand parents.
 Angelica Jones as a Flowerette - One of the two villains created in the computer world by Terracotta. Skilled martial artist, their dual attacks proved too much for even Krystala, actually beating her into submission
 Kitkat as a Flowerette - One of the two villains created in the computer world by Terracotta. Skilled martial artist, their dual attacks proved too much for even Krystala, actually beating her into submission.
 Jeffrey Santos as Likido - A man who has the ability to transform into any form of liquid, and can turn things into liquid. Has repeatedly evaded Krystala because of this ability, even discovering her secret identity. He was formerly a ridiculed scientist named Salenga who was performing an experiment until he was exposed in a chemical accident turning him into the villain Likido. 
 Gabe Mercado as Gravigat - A man who can manipulate gravity. Despite seemingly incompetent at first glance (which may have led Krystala into thinking that she could easily beat him), his powers afford him a tremendous advantage over many foes. In fact, he humiliated Krystala on their first encounter where, after Krystala made her presence known to Gravigat while still hovering in mid-air, he lessened the gravity centered on the heroine's location where she was still hovering, this caused her to lose control over her flight powers, preventing her from landing, trapping her in the air. Gravigat is notably the first villain to be able to use Krystala's powers against her, leaving her defenseless as he made his getaway. The gravity around Krystala only returned to normal after Gravigat left the vicinity. Unfortunately, by this time she had also canceled her own levitation as she attempted to fight the opposing force of anti-gravity that was keeping her stuck unsupported in the air a while back, she fell face-first to the floor. 
 Sid Lucero as Sugo ng Dilim - The main villain in the TV series and the leader of the villains.

Krystala's allies
 Ryan Agoncillo as Miguel
 TJ Trinidad as Gino Salvador
 Angel Jacob as Luwalhati
 Ama Quiambao as Ima
 Pokwang as Fantasya
 Hero Angeles as Loverboy/Mysterio
 Sandara Park as Kim, Miguel's half-sister
 Kathryn Bernardo as Bullinggit 
 Aaron Junatas as Mokong, brother of Tala
 Roence Santos as Patotina
 Kristoffer Horace Neudeck as Brutus/Morphino
 Sharlene San Pedro and Mikylla Ramirez as young Tala/Faith

Extended cast
 Spanky Manikan as Mang George
 Menggie Cobarrubias as Atty. Amado Salvador
 Danica Sotto as Kate Salvador
 Susan Africa as Aleta
 Ronnie Lazaro as Joram
 Carlo Aquino as Giwal
 Vanna Garcia as Yagi
 Rey Abellana as Martin
 CJ Navato as Young Igo
 Roy Alvarez as Bacchus Salvador
 Janus del Prado as Adur
 Crispin Pineda as Anito
 Gilleth Sandico as Nali
 Gerard Acao as Tiny
 Neil Ryan Sese as Rolly
 Idda Yaneza as Belen
 Boyd Tinio as Gaynor
 Manny Distor as Darius
 Arnold Reyes as Lalanilaw

Krystala's powers/abilities and items/weapons

Powers/abilities
Krystal Blast - Energy blasts that shoot out of her hands
Superhuman strength
Flight
Speed
Krystal shield
Ability to create earthquakes
Teleport to other worlds
Skilled in martial arts

Items/weapons
The Crystal (Krystal) - the crystal Tala uses to transform into Krystala and back again.
Krystal shield
Bow and arrow
Blade
Sword
Cape - Krystala's cape is near-indestructible, and could contain a mighty explosion if draped over a bomb

Awards and nominations

Soundtrack
This is the original soundtrack of 'Krystala'. In the TV series, the theme song, 'Super Krystala', was sung by Aegis, but the Krystala soundtrack featured Sheryn Regis singing the theme song instead.

Super Krystala - Sheryn Regis
Yakap Mo - Dianne Dela Fuente
Ba't Di Mo Pagbigyan (Duet) - King and Maoui David
Sana - Mike Empeno
Shoobee Doo Wop - Sheryn Regis
Kapangyarihan - Gloc 9
Sa Pangarap Na Lang - Marinel Santos
Ikaw Lang Pala - Josh Santana
If I Believed - Carol Banawa
Laban Krystala - Gloc 9 with JM
laban sa kahirapan- von aga

See also
Sanlakas Kids (Upcoming series that will feature Krystala in a cameo appearance)
List of Filipino superheroes
List of Filipino supervillains
List of telenovelas of ABS-CBN
List of shows previously aired by ABS-CBN

References

External links

 Krystala on The Filipino Channel

 Krystala bio at International Hero

2004 Philippine television series debuts
2005 Philippine television series endings
ABS-CBN drama series
Fantaserye and telefantasya
AZN Television original programming
Television series by Star Creatives
Philippine science fiction television series
Filipino-language television shows
Television shows set in the Philippines